Kinilaw ( or , literally "eaten raw") is a raw seafood dish and preparation method native to the Philippines. It is also referred to as Philippine ceviche due to its similarity to the Latin American dish ceviche. It is more accurately a cooking process that relies on vinegar and acidic fruit juices (usually citrus) to denature the ingredients, rather than a dish, as it can also be used to prepare meat and vegetables. Kinilaw dishes are usually eaten as appetizers before a meal, or as finger food with alcoholic drinks. Kinilaw is also sometimes called kilawin, but it should not be confused with the northern Philippine grilled meat dish, kilawin, to which it is related to but is different.

Description
The most common kinilaw dish is kinilaw na isda ("fish kinilaw")  prepared using raw cubed fish mixed with vinegar (usually coconut vinegar or cane vinegar) as the primary denaturing agent; along with a souring agent to enhance the tartness like calamansi, dayap, biasong, kamias, tamarind, green mangoes, balimbing, and green sineguelas. It is flavored with salt and spices like black pepper, ginger, onions, and chili peppers (commonly siling labuyo or bird's eye chili). An average serving of fish kinilaw contains just 147 calories.

To neutralize the fishy taste and acidity before serving, juice extracts from the grated flesh of tabon-tabon, dungon, or young coconuts are also commonly added. Extracts from the bark scrapings of sineguelas or bakawan trees (Rhizophora mangroves) are also used similarly. Some regional variants also include gatâ (coconut milk), sugar, or even soft drinks to reduce the sourness.

Fish are primarily used, ranging from tanigue or tangigue (Spanish mackerels, king mackerel, or wahoo), malasugi (marlins or swordfish), tambakol, bangus, shark, and anchovies. Other viands include shrimp, squid, clams, oysters, crabs, sea urchin roe, seaweed, jellyfish, shipworms (tamilok) or even beetle larvae.

Seafood must be fresh and properly cleaned, mitigating health hazards involved with consuming raw seafood. Some like squid, however, must be blanched to tenderize the flesh.

Ensalada 

Kinilaw also refers to dishes using raw fruits and vegetables marinated in vinegar and spices, in which case the dishes are sometimes referred to by the Spanish term ensalada ("salad"). Examples include pipino, ampalaya, young camote leaves, young papaya, pako, and banana flowers.

History
Kinilaw is native to the Philippines. The Balangay archaeological excavation site in Butuan (dated c. 10th to 13th century AD) has uncovered remains of halved tabon-tabon fruits and fish bones cut in a manner suggesting that they were cubed, thus indicating that the cooking process is at least a thousand years old. It was also described by Spanish colonists and explorers to the Philippines, with the earliest mention being in the Vocabulario de la lengua tagala (1613) as cqinicqilao and cquilao, a Hispanicized spelling of the Visayan verb kilaw ("to eat raw"), and a cognate of the adjective hilaw ("raw", "uncooked", or "unripe").  Other sources that mention it include the Vocabulario de la lengua Pampanga en romance (1732) as quilao; and in the 1754 edition of Vocabulario de la lengua tagala as quilauin.

Unlike Latin American ceviches, which exclusively use citrus juices (which are not native to the Americas), kinilaw instead primarily uses a combination of vinegar and citrus (native to tropical Asia), and other acidic fruit juices.

Regional names and variants
Some of the oldest surviving kinilaw variants are from the southern Visayas and Northern Mindanao, like Cagayan de Oro's kinilaw (sometimes stylized as kinilaw de Oro) and Dumaguete's binakhaw. Both are direct descendants of ancient Visayan preparation methods as displayed in the Butuan archeological finds. These are the original versions that use tabon-tabon and dungon fruits respectively.

Several regions of the Philippines have local specialties or names of kinilaw dishes. In the northern Philippines, the Ivatan people of the Batanes islands refer to kinilaw as lataven. Ivatan fish kinilaw is known as lataven a among (also spelled lataven a amung). In the southern Philippines, the Tausug people of the Sulu islands refer to fish kinilaw as lawal. Unlike other kinilaw dishes, lawal usesvinegar to wash the fish, and uses citrus fruits and other souring agents to denature the fish meat. Among the Sama-Bajau people, it is known as kilau or kinilau and sometimes includes unripe mangoes as a souring agent. Among the Maranao people of southwestern Mindanao, biyaring is a type of kinilaw made with tiny shrimp. It is a regional favorite and is notable because it is ideally prepared while the shrimp are still alive.

A common way of serving kinilaw in the islands of Visayas and Mindanao is sinuglaw, which combines fish kinilaw (usually tuna) and charcoal-grilled pork belly (sinugba).

See also 
 Kilawin - related dish from northern Luzon that uses blanched and grilled meat
 Kelaguen - Chamorro dish derived from kilawin
 Hinava - related Malaysian dish in Sabah
 Gohu ikan - related Indonesian dish in Maluku
 'Ota 'ika - related Polynesian dish
 Poke - related Hawaiian dish
 Ceviche - similar Latin American dish 
 List of other raw fish dishes

References 

Philippine seafood dishes
Salads
Vegetarian dishes of the Philippines